United States gubernatorial elections were held on November 7, 2017, in two states: Virginia and New Jersey. These elections formed part of the 2017 United States elections. The last regular gubernatorial elections for these two states were in 2013. Both incumbents were term-limited, so both seats were open. Democrats held the governorship in Virginia and picked up the governorship of New Jersey. 

For the first time since 2008, Democrats won the total popular vote of the year's gubernatorial elections.

Election predictions
Several sites and individuals publish predictions of competitive seats. These predictions look at factors such as the strength of the incumbent (if the incumbent is running for re-election), the strength of the candidates, and the partisan leanings of the state (reflected in part by the state's Cook Partisan Voting Index rating). The predictions assign ratings to each seat, with the rating indicating the predicted advantage that a party has in winning that seat. Most election predictors use "tossup" to indicate that neither party has an advantage, "lean" to indicate that one party has a slight advantage, "likely" or "favored" to indicate that one party has a significant but not insurmountable advantage, and "safe" or "solid" to indicate that one party has a near-certain chance of victory. Some predictions also include a "tilt" rating that indicates that one party has an advantage that is not quite as strong as the "lean" rating would indicate.

Race summary

Results

Closest races 
States where the margin of victory was less than 10%:
 Virginia, 8.90%

Blue denotes states won by Democrats.

Partisan control by state

New Jersey 

The 2017 New Jersey gubernatorial election was held on November 7, 2017. There were seven candidates. Candidates for Lieutenant Governor of New Jersey run on the same ticket and thus are elected at the same time. Incumbent Republican Governor Chris Christie was term-limited and could not run for a third consecutive term.

Primary elections took place on June 6, 2017. Kim Guadagno, Lieutenant Governor of New Jersey, won the Republican primary. Woodcliff Lake Mayor Carlos Rendo was her running mate. Phil Murphy, banker and former U.S. Ambassador to Germany, won the Democratic primary. Former State Assembly Speaker Sheila Oliver was his running mate. Seth Kaper-Dale ran as the Green Party candidate; his running mate was Lisa Durden. Pete Rohrman ran as the Libertarian Party candidate; his running mate was Karrese Laguerre. Matt Riccardi ran as the Constitution Party candidate. There were two other independent candidates on the ballot.

Murphy was declared to be the winner when polls closed at 8 pm EST based on exit polling alone. He ultimately received 56.0% of the vote, winning with a 14.1% vote lead over his opponent. This was similar to the results in the 2016 election with Murphy slightly outperforming Hillary Clinton by one percentage point. However, with just 38.5% of registered voters casting ballots, this would be the lowest turnout on record for a gubernatorial election in New Jersey. This was the first gubernatorial election in New Jersey since 1989, in which the Democratic candidate won Somerset County. 

Results

Virginia 

Democratic Governor Terry McAuliffe won election with 48% of the vote in 2013. McAuliffe was not eligible to run for reelection due to term limits established by the Virginia Constitution.

The Virginia gubernatorial election of 2017 was held on November 7, 2017. Primary elections took place on June 13, 2017. Virginia utilizes an open primary, in which registered voters are allowed to vote in either party's primary election. The Democratic Party nominated Ralph Northam and the Republican Party nominated Ed Gillespie. The Libertarian Party nominated Clifford Hyra by convention on May 6, 2017.

In the general election on November 7, 2017, Democratic nominee Ralph Northam defeated Republican nominee Ed Gillespie, winning by the largest margin for a Democrat since 1985. Northam became the 73rd governor of Virginia, and assumed office on January 13, 2018. The election had the highest voter turnout percentage in a Virginia gubernatorial election in twenty years with over 47% of the state's constituency casting their ballot.

Results

See also

2017 United States elections
2017 New Jersey elections
2017 Virginia elections

Notes

References

 
Gubernatorial
November 2017 events in the United States